The Isham Day House is located in Mequon, Wisconsin. It was added to the National Register of Historic Places in 2000. The house is owned by the city and located in Settlers Park.

See also
List of the oldest buildings in Wisconsin

References

External links
 City of Mequon: Settlers Park

Houses on the National Register of Historic Places in Wisconsin
Houses in Ozaukee County, Wisconsin
Houses completed in 1839
National Register of Historic Places in Ozaukee County, Wisconsin